Henry Gaylord Wilshire (June 7, 1861 – September 7, 1927), known to his contemporaries by his middle name of "Gaylord", was an American land developer, publisher, and outspoken socialist.  He is the namesake of Los Angeles' Wilshire Boulevard.

Biography

Early years

Henry Gaylord Wilshire was born June 7, 1861, in Cincinnati, Ohio. He moved to Los Angeles, California in 1884.

In 1895 he began developing  stretching westward from Westlake Park for an elite residential subdivision. He donated a strip of land to the city of Los Angeles for a boulevard through what was then a barley field, on the conditions that it would be named for him and that railroad lines and commercial or industrial trucking would be banned.

In 1900, Wilshire was arrested for speaking in a public park in Los Angeles. A judge dismissed the charges, but the incident caused Wilshire to leave Los Angeles for New York.

Political career

Wilshire was a frequent and far-ranging political candidate. He stood as the Nationalist Party Congressional candidate for the 6th California District in 1890, as the candidate of the Socialist Labor Party for Attorney General in 1891, for the British Parliament in 1894, for Congress in the California 6th District again in 1900, this time on the ticket of the Social Democratic Party of America, for the Canadian Parliament in 1902, and for Congress from New York in 1904. In 1909 Wilshire was a candidate for city council in Los Angeles as a part of the Socialist Party slate, which was backed at that time by the Los Angeles unions. By about 1911 Wilshire began to have his doubts about electoral politics, and shifted his allegiance to revolutionary syndicalism and advocacy of the general strike. He was the editor of the Syndicalist League's magazine The Syndicalist during 1913. During World War I Wilshire worked with Emma Goldman in the Free Speech League in New York.

In 1900, Wilshire launched the first of his publishing ventures in Los Angeles, a magazine called The Challenge. At least 40 issues of the publication were produced between December 1900 and October 1901. The name of this publication was subsequently changed to Wilshire's Monthly Magazine in 1901, before being shortened to Wilshire's Magazine (1902) and Wilshire's (1904),  with publication variously in New York and Toronto. First a small-format magazine, later a tabloid newspaper, Wilshire's continued in production until February 1915.

Later life, death, and legacy

Wilshire eventually returned to Los Angeles and made his connection with the now famous boulevard that bore his name. He had no direct involvement with its gradual expansion in the years while he was absent from the region.

Wilshire was also interested in the health industry. In 1925, he started marketing the Ionaco, an electric belt that could purportedly improve health. The belt gained popularity from its marketing, but was dismissed by medical health experts as quackery.

He died destitute on September 7, 1927 in New York. He was buried at Woodlawn Cemetery in The Bronx, New York.

Wilshire Drive in Phoenix, Arizona, was named after him, as is Wilshire Avenue in Fullerton, California (where he first ran for Congress in 1890, the first congressional candidate in America from what became a socialist-oriented party).

See also

 Wilshire Boulevard

Footnotes

Works

Books and pamphlets

 Why American Workingmen Should Be Socialists. 1891. —Four page leaflet.
 Free Trade vs. Protection. New York: Socialist League of America, 1892.
 The Poor Farmer and Why He is Poor. Fullerton, CA: Nationalist Publication Co., n.d. [c. 1899].
 Liquid Air: Perpetual Motion at Last: Tripler's Surplusage Explained. Los Angeles, n.p., 1899.
 The Problem of the Trust. Los Angeles: [Gaylord Wilshire], 1900.
 The Trust Problem. Los Angeles: Social Democratic Party, 1900.
 Imperialism. Los Angeles: Los Angeles Branch of the Social Democratic Party, 1900.
 A Business-like City Charter. Los Angeles: Allied Printing, 1900.
 Trusts and Imperialism.  Chicago: Charles H. Kerr & Co., 1901.
 Imperative Mandate, Initiative and Referendum: Adopted in the Late Proposed New Charter for Los Angeles. Los Angeles: Gaylord Wilshire, 1901.
 Debate on Socialism, Wilshire-Seligman: A Verbatim Report of the Greatest Debate in the History of Socialism in the United States, Which Took Place in Cooper Union, January 16, 1903, New York City. With E.R.A. Seligman. New York: Wilshire's Magazine, 1903.
 Ten Cents a Year. New York: Wilshire Book Co., 1905.
 Wilshire-Carver Debate on Socialism: Gaylord Wilshire vs. Thomas Nixon Carver: Held January 15, 1906, at Hartford, Conn. Before the "Get Together Club." New York: Wilshire Book Co., 1906.
 Socialism: A Religion. New York: Wilshire Book Co., 1906.
 Wilshire Editorials. New York: Wilshire Book Co., 1906.
 Socialism Inevitable (Wilshire Editorials). New York: Wilshire Book Co., 1907.
 Socialism: The Mallock-Wilshire Argument. New York: Wilshire Book Co., n.d. [c. 1907].
 The Significance of the Trusts. New York : Wilshire Book Co., n.d. [c. 1900s].
 Hop Lee and the Pelican. New York : Wilshire Book Co., n.d. [c. 1900s].
 Why a Workingman Should Be a Socialist. Chicago: Charles H. Kerr & Co., n.d. [c. 1912].
 Syndicalism: What It Is. London: 20th Century Press, 1912.
 I-ON-A-CO: The Short Road to Health. Los Angeles: [Gaylord Wilshire], n.d. [c. 1926].

Magazines
 Wilshire's Magazine [Toronto], 1903, part 1. Issues 54-58. Google Books project. Retrieved April 21, 2010.

Further reading

 Mark W. Nelson, "Henry Gaylord Wilshire: At the Barricades for Socialism and Amour," Southern California Quarterly, Vol. 96, No. 1 (Spring 2014), pp. 41-85. In JSTOR
 Lou Rosen, Henry Gaylord Wilshire: The Millionaire Socialist. Pacific Palisades, CA: School Justice Institute, 2011.
 Howard H. Quint, "Gaylord Wilshire and Socialism's First Congressional Campaign," Pacific Historical Review, vol. 26, no. 4 (Nov. 1957), pp. 327–340. In JSTOR.

External links
 
Wilshire Boulevard Milestones
Online Archive of California – Henry Gaylord Wilshire biography
Rhymes and Reactions (Jul 1926) - Gaylord Wilshire's Ionaco

1861 births
1927 deaths
American newspaper editors
American real estate businesspeople
Businesspeople from Los Angeles
American socialists
History of Los Angeles
Socialist Labor Party of America politicians from California
Social Democratic Party of America politicians
Wilshire Boulevard
Socialist Party of America politicians from California
Journalists from New York City
People from Cincinnati